Krzyżowa  is a village in the administrative district of Gmina Ścinawa, within Lubin County, Lower Silesian Voivodeship, in south-western Poland.

The Polish National road 36 runs nearby, north of Krzyżowa, and the Voivodeship road 292 passes east of the village.

References

Villages in Lubin County